Nocton Park Priory was an Augustinian priory  in Nocton, Lincolnshire, England.

The priory of Nocton Park was founded by Robert Darcy in honour of Saint Mary Magdalene, probably during the reign of King Stephen, in or near a pre-existing deer park known as Nocton Park. It later descended by marriage to the Wymbish family.

Little is known of the history of the house, as only one visitation report is preserved. In 1440 there were four canons beside the prior, as well as a canon of Thornton.

It was Dissolved in 1536. In 1569/70, Sir Henry Stanley, Lord Strange, (later Earl of Derby), constructed a house from the monastic ruins. At the end of the 17th century the house was abandoned and the buildings were dismantled. The site is scheduled and there are earthworks visible on Abbey Hill. In the middle of the eastern side of the site are the earth-covered foundations of a long rectangular building aligned east–west; this has been interpreted as the monastic church. Near to the west end of the church is a raised area where further earthworks define a large rectangular building thought to represent the remains of the post-Dissolution house.

References

Monasteries in Lincolnshire